XHALC-TV was a television station on channel 9 in Aldama, Chihuahua, Mexico. It was operated by the municipality of Aldama.

References

Spanish-language television stations in Mexico